Martin Harley (born 1975, Cardiff, Wales) is a British singer-songwriter and slide guitarist. Specialising in folk and blues, he and his band have released five albums between 2003 and 2012.

Biography

Career
Harley moved with his family to Woking, Surrey, England as a small child.

He is the founder of The Martin Harley Band, a British blues trio and also performs solo as Martin Harley. Harley has been developing a steady solo career in the 
US with the release of his first US album, "Mojo Fix" in the Fall of 2012.  The Martin Harley Band continues to tour in the UK and abroad and Harley balances both band
and solo careers.  The band has a diverse appeal, attracting blues fans as well as a cult following amongst surfers. This may be due to tours and support slots with G. Love & Special Sauce, Ash Grunwald, Newton Faulkner and Donavon Frankenreiter, Carus and The True Believers and The Beautiful Girls.

The band are renowned for their live concerts and the obscure instrumentation they use, which includes a Weissenborn guitar, balalaika, cocktail drumkit, cajon and double bass. To date they have released five albums, all of which have been released on independent record labels with national distribution.  Harley first recorded a solo album in Australia at the beginning of his recording career.  In 2012, he travelled to Texas to team up with Bob Parr, former Los Angeles studio bassist and producer and original bass player for The Brian Setzer Orchestra, and his wife, Claire Parr, to produce a US solo album entitled Mojo Fix. Mojo Fix featured the first time that Harley has used multiple outside musicians and features a more rock-tinged approach with more use of his Weissenborn guitar.  Guest musicians on the album include Santana and Steve Winwood veteran Walfredo Reyes on drums, McKenzie Smith of Midlake, and also Charlie Bisharat, a violinist known for his work with Shadowfax.  Harley spent much of the year travelling between the US and the UK and opening for artists such as Beth Hart, Five For Fighting, Good Old War, and Gavin DeGraw.  He launched his US release in Boulder, Colorado, performing as an opener with ZZ Ward and has been gaining ground on non-commercial adult alternative
radio across the US Harley was featured performing "Mojo Fix" on VH1's Big Morning Buzz TV Show, and also had two songs from the album Mojo Fix appear in the backdoor pilot of the CW Network series The Originals, spun off inside the popular series The Vampire Diaries.

In the United Kingdom, The Martin Harley Band are a regularly touring ensemble, and have toured with James Morrison, appeared on BBC Radio 2 on the Aled Jones, Bob Harris and Johnnie Walker shows. Harley has also been interviewed by Guitarist magazine, and featured in a three DVD set providing slide guitar tips and tricks.

The band are favourites of Hugh Fearnley-Whittingstall, and have played several gigs at River Cottage H.Q., and appeared on a charity compilation album sold to raise money for Rural Revival and CARE International.

Harley is currently endorsed by the luthier, Andreas Cuntz.

Travel
In 2005, Harley took part in what has been recognised by Guinness World Records as the 'Highest Gig in the World', playing at 21,000 feet up Kala Patthar in the Himalayas. For this concert Harley was endorsed by Blueridge Guitars. In early 2007, he spent six weeks wandering through Mali, Guinea and Senegal in the company of some of those country's musicians. The event was recorded by a French film crew, and a CD and DVD is scheduled for release. One of the sessions included Vieux Farka Toure.

In 2010, Harley undertook the "Blues Gone Green Tour", a 27 show, 1,200-mile acoustic tour of the UK by bicycle over thirty-one days. The tour was supported by Sustrans, Villages in Action plus the Rural Touring Circuit and Surly Bikes.

Collaborations
Harley's slide guitar work can also be heard on Kate Walsh's Tim's House, Fink's Biscuits for Breakfast, and Hardkandy's Second to None.

Discography
 Martin Harley (2003) (self release)
 Money Don't Matter (2005) Transistor Records
 Grow Your Own (2008) – mastered by Bob Katz.
 Drumrolls for Sommersaults (2010) Villainous Records – produced by Nigel Stonier and featuring Thea Gilmore on the track "Hand to Hold".
 Mojo Fix (2012)60/20 Records – produced by Bob Parr and featuring "Mojo Fix", "Cardboard King", "Ball & Chain" and "Outlaw"
 Live At Southern Ground (2015) Del Mundo Records - with Daniel Kimbro (upright bass), recorded without edits at Southern Ground studio in Nashville
 Static In The Wires (2017) Del Mundo Records - with Daniel Kimbro (upright bass), feat. Jerry Douglas, Derek Mixon and Micah Hulscher
 Roll With The Punches (2019)

References

External links
Official website
Andreas Cuntz Master Luthier

1975 births
Living people
British male singer-songwriters
British folk guitarists
British male guitarists
British blues guitarists
Weissenborn players
21st-century British singers
21st-century British guitarists
21st-century British male singers